Richard Lee Kester (born July 7, 1946) is an American former Major League Baseball pitcher.

External links

1946 births
Living people
Baseball players from New York (state)
Atlanta Braves players
Major League Baseball pitchers
People from Iola, Kansas
Arizona Instructional League Braves players
Austin Braves players
Greenwood Braves players
Richmond Braves players